Hopegill Head is a fell in the English Lake District in Cumbria. It is located nine kilometres (5½ miles) west of the town of Keswick and is well seen from the B5292 road which crosses the Whinlatter Pass.

Topography
Hopegill Head is the middle fell of three fells on a ridge that starts at Braithwaite and goes west for eight kilometres to conclude at the northern end of Crummock Water. The other two fells on the ridge are Grisedale Pike and Whiteside. The fell is often referred to locally as Hobcarton Pike as it stands at the head of Hobcarton Gill. However, the Ordnance Survey have officially named the fell Hopegill Head on maps after Hope Gill, which is another valley that goes north-west from the summit. Hopegill Head reaches a height of 770 metres (2526 feet) and has two subsidiary summits, Ladyside Pike (703 metres / 2306 feet) and Sand Hill (756 metres / 2480 feet) both of which have Nuttall status.

Hopegill Head’s most striking feature is the 130-metre-high (417-foot-high) cliff of Hobcarton Crag, which drops precipitously to Hobcarton Gill on the fell's north east side. These cliffs are unsuitable for conventional rock climbing because they are made of crumbly Skiddaw Slate but they do provide good winter climbing with the best known routes being Thompson’s Chimney and Cave Route. The crags, which are owned by the National Trust, are the only location in England of Viscaria alpina, the red alpine catchfly.

Geology
The laminated mudstone and siltstone of the Kirkstile Formation predominated, with the underlying greywacke sandstone of the Loweswater Formation outcropping to the north.

Ascents
Hopegill Head can be climbed by various routes. Many people arrive along the ridge from Grisedale Pike or Whiteside but it is also possible to ascend from the Vale of Lorton and from the Whinlatter Pass road by the north west ridge, taking in the subsidiary top of Ladyside Pike. It is also possible to arrive or leave via the Coledale Hause passing over the satellite summit of Sand Hill. This is quite often done as part of the Coledale Round, an 18 kilometre horseshoe walk which takes in the other Coledale fells of Grisedale Pike, Eel Crag, Sail, Scar Crags and Causey Pike.

Summit
The summit of the fell is an exhilarating place, a small pointed peak poised on the edge of Hobcarton Crag giving wide ranging views. The Isle of Man is seen on clear days, as are the Scottish Border hills. To the east the Helvellyn range is well seen.

References 

 A Pictorial Guide to the Lakeland Fells, The North Western Fells: Alfred Wainwright: 
 Wainwright’s Favourite Lakeland Mountains: Alfred Wainwright: 
 The Mountains of England and Wales, Volume 2, John and Anne Nuttall,

External links
 Striding Edge

Hewitts of England
Fells of the Lake District
Nuttalls
Buttermere, Cumbria (village)